Tim O'Malley may refer to:
 Tim O'Malley (politician) (born 1944), Irish politician 
 Tim O'Malley (rugby union) (born 1994), New Zealand rugby union player 
 Tim O'Malley (actor), author of Godshow